Christopher Robin Olivares Burga (born 3 April 1999) is a Peruvian footballer who currently plays as a forward for Sporting Cristal.

He is the son of former Peru International Percy Olivares.

Career statistics

Club

Notes
Honours
Sporting Cristal
 Liga 1: 2020
 Copa Bicentenario: 2021
 Torneo Apertura: 2021

References

1999 births
Living people
Peruvian footballers
Peru youth international footballers
Peruvian expatriate footballers
Association football forwards
Peruvian Primera División players
Liga Portugal 2 players
Sporting Cristal footballers
Vitória S.C. B players
Peruvian expatriate sportspeople in Portugal
Expatriate footballers in Portugal
Footballers from Lima

External links